Bryan Colula Alarcón (born 6 April 1996) is a Mexican professional footballer who plays as a right-back for Liga MX club Mazatlán.

Honours
Necaxa
Copa MX: Clausura 2018

References

External links

1996 births
Living people
Mexican footballers
Association football fullbacks
Club América footballers
Venados F.C. players
Club Necaxa footballers
Alebrijes de Oaxaca players
Club Atlético Zacatepec players
Club Tijuana footballers
Liga MX players
Ascenso MX players
Liga Premier de México players
People from Xalapa
Footballers from Veracruz